Barbro Larsson (born 8 January 1931) is a Swedish stage and film actress. She was married to the actor Lennart Lindberg in the 1950s.

Selected filmography
 Jack of Hearts (1950)
 My Friend Oscar (1951)
 Time of Desire (1954)
 Blue Sky (1955)
 Stage Entrance (1956)

References

Bibliography 
 Goble, Alan. The Complete Index to Literary Sources in Film. Walter de Gruyter, 1999.

External links 
 

1931 births
Living people
Actresses from Stockholm
Swedish film actresses
Swedish stage actresses